Ciscero Thomas Warren (October 20, 1919 – June 25, 2009) was an American Negro league pitcher in the 1940s.

A native of Baltimore, Maryland, Warren served in the US Army during World War II. He made his Negro leagues debut in 1946 with the Homestead Grays, and played for the Grays again the following season. Warren died in Mountainside, New Jersey in 2009 at age 89.

References

External links
 and Seamheads

1919 births
2009 deaths
Homestead Grays players
Baseball pitchers
Baseball players from Baltimore
United States Army personnel of World War II
20th-century African-American sportspeople
21st-century African-American people